Nicole Miller is an American politician who has served in the Oklahoma House of Representatives from the 82nd district since 2019.

Early life
Miller was born to a Nazarene pastor father and schoolteacher mother. She grew up across the United States as her father worked in various ministries before settling down in Fort Worth, Texas.

References

Living people
Republican Party members of the Oklahoma House of Representatives
21st-century American politicians
21st-century American women politicians
Women state legislators in Oklahoma
Year of birth missing (living people)